Mosharraf Hossain (Bengali: মোশাররফ হোসেন, 7 March 1925 – 3 February 1974) was a politician and lawyer from Jessore (also spelt Jashore, Bengali: যশোর), Bangladesh. He was actively involved in the Bengali nationalist movement in East Pakistan and the Liberation War of Bangladesh in 1971.

He was elected as a Member of the Provincial Assembly of East Pakistan in the 1970 election, and was a Member of the Constituent Assembly of Bangladesh from April 1971 to September 1972. In 1972, he resigned from the Constituent Assembly, left the ruling party Awami League, and joined the left-wing party Jatiya Samajtantrik Dal (abbr. JSD or JASAD or 'জাসদ') as one of its founding vice presidents.

Early life 
Born in the Sabhaipur village of Bangaon (which was then a Mahakuma of the greater Jessore district), Mosharraf studied in Jessore Zilla School and Michael Madhusudan College (known at that time as Jessore College) of today's Jessore city.

Political career

Post British India 
After finishing his law degree (LL.B.) from Ripon College (under the University of Calcutta), Mosharraf made a brief foray into the state politics of West Bengal. In the Legislative Assembly Election of West Bengal in 1951/52, he contested in the Bangaon constituency as an independent candidate against Jibon Ratan Dhar of the Indian National Congress and Ajit Kumar Ganguly of the Communist Party of India. In 1953, due to his continued opposition to the ruling party, Congress, the Indian government accused him of treason and issued him a 24-hour ultimatum to leave the country.

East Pakistan 

Afterwards, Hossain returned to Jessore city and continued developing his political career in East Pakistan with Awami League. He was the secretary of the central relief committee that was formed in Jessore to help the refugees fleeing into Pakistan during the 1964 Calcutta riots. In 1967, when Sheikh Mujibur Rahman was in jail, Awami League got split into two groups due to disagreements over the Six-point demand. Many of Mosharraf's political compatriots, including Mashiur Rahman and Raushan Ali of Jessore, joined the Pro-PDM faction of Awami League that opposed the Six-point. However, Mosharraf remained in the mainstream Awami League, with the Six-pointers. The Pro-PDM leaders eventually returned during the anti-Ayub movement. An avid political supporter of both the Six-point movement and the 1969 East Pakistan mass uprising, Advocate Mosharraf won in the 1970 Pakistani provincial election from Jessore. On 18 March 1971, in a joint press statement, Mosharraf Hossain, along with Mashiur Rahman and Raushan Ali, alleged that the local military was trying to create panic among the people and demanded punishment for those involved.

Bangladesh Liberation War 
During the Liberation War of Bangladesh in 1971, Pakistan’s military government brought several charges against Mosharraf for his activities against the state. Though he evaded capture during Operation Searchlight, his house in Jessore city was raided on 25 March and later seized by the Pakistan army to be used as a camp. At the very early stage of the war, when the Indian government was hesitant to get involved, he met Indian leaders like Jayaprakash Narayan, Indian Prime Minister Indira Gandhi, and the Chief Minister of West Bengal, requesting equipment and initiating support for the refugees. He became a member of the Constituent Assembly of Bangladesh in April.

Witness reports from Jessore published in Indian sources mention that the Pakistan army tried fanatically to apprehend Mosharraf Hossain. A reward was announced for the capture of him, dead or alive. In November 1971, Bangladesh Awami League, operating the Provisional Government of Bangladesh in exile, tasked him with setting up local administration in the Jessore district and restoring Awami League's organizational capabilities in the area.

Independent Bangladesh 
Though Mosharraf was a central committee member of Awami League, his political differences with the party leadership grew over time. This led to his eventual departure from the party and his resignation from the Constituent Assembly of Bangladesh in 1972. 

On 10 September 1972, Awami League temporarily suspended the primary membership of Mosharraf, accusing him of violating party orders, acting against the party’s interest, and corruption. The party sent him a notice ordering him to explain his conduct or face permanent expulsion. In a return statement, Mosharraf denied any allegation of corruption. He also questioned the Awami League committee's authority over giving him such notice and denounced the party, condemning it for losing its ideology, rampant corruption, and nepotism. In the same statement, he announced his resignation from the Constituent Assembly. The acting speaker granted his resignation on 22 September, and the official gazette of cessation was published on 26 September of the same year. He then became the founding vice-president of the newly formed opposition party Jatiya Samajtantrik Dal (abbr. JSD or JASAD or 'জাসদ') and also the president of Jessore district JSD. JSD was first formed on 31 October.

Mosharraf Hossain went on to participate in the 1973 Bangladeshi general election as a JSD candidate in the (now defunct) Jessore 9 constituency but lost to Raushan Ali of Awami League. In total, only three candidates from the opposition parties, JSD, NAP (M), and Jatiya League, were able to win across the country. The margin of Awami League's victory came as a surprise to many observers.

Following the election, Mosharraf's personal safety became precarious amid an increasingly violent political struggle between Awami League and JSD, plus other left-wing insurgents. Soon he was arrested by the Rakkhi Bahini, a paramilitary force formed by the Bangladesh government to curb the insurgency. He was released on bail after two months.

Assassination 
Mosharraf Hossain was assassinated by a gang of unknown armed operatives on 3 February 1974. He was gunned down to death at his residence by masked assailants while talking with two political associates. At least one of those who were present with him that night got seriously injured in the attack. At that time, Mosharraf was the vice president of Bangladesh JSD. The party organized a general strike in Jessore, demonstrations in Dhaka, and nationwide protests decrying the brutal killing.

Political leaders, including Bangabandhu Sheikh Mujibur Rahman, expressed their shock and condolences. In a message to the deceased's family, the Prime Minister wrote - "His contribution to our liberation struggle will be remembered by everyone."

Mosharraf Hossain's daughter Raoshan Jahan Sathi was a member of the 9th Parliament of Bangladesh. His son-in-law Kazi Aref Ahmed was one of the organizers of the Bangladesh Liberation war.

References 

1925 births
1974 deaths
Assassinated Bangladeshi politicians
Jatiya Samajtantrik Dal-JSD politicians
1974 murders in Bangladesh